This is a comprehensive listing of all releases by Public Announcement, a R&B dance group from Chicago, Illinois, United States. They released their self-titled debut album, Born into the 90's, in January 1992 with fellow R&B singer R. Kelly. It featured the singles "She's Got That Vibe", "Honey Love", and "Slow Dance (Hey Mr. DJ)". The album charted at #42 on the all-genre Billboard 200 and #1 on the Top R&B/Hip-Hop Albums chart. The group's second album, All Work, No Play, was released in March 1998. However, it only managed to peak at #81 on the Billboard 200, despite the album's first single, Body Bumpin' (Yippie-Yi-Yo) went to #5 on the Billboard Hot 100.

Public Announcement has released ten singles to radio, eight music videos, and four studio albums.

Albums

Singles

Music videos

As a lead artist

References

Discographies of American artists
Pop music group discographies
Rhythm and blues discographies